Stefan Schmidt (born 8 March 1989) is a German footballer who plays as a goalkeeper for Regionalliga Nordost club VfB Auerbach.

Career

Schmidt came through the Chemnitzer FC's youth team, and made his first-team debut on the last day of the 2008–09 season as a half-time substitute for Enrico Keller in a 1–1 draw against 1. FC Magdeburg. For the next four years, he largely served as understudy to Philipp Pentke, and made 13 appearances in the 2010–11 season as the club won the Regionalliga Nord and promotion to the 3. Liga. In his first season at this level he was confined entirely to the bench, but he made eight appearances during the 2012–13 season when Pentke was out injured. He signed for Carl Zeiss Jena of the Regionalliga Nordost in July 2013. He left Jena after one season and has had subsequent spells with Empor Glauchau and VfB Auerbach.

References

External links 
 

1989 births
Living people
People from Flöha
German footballers
Association football goalkeepers
3. Liga players
Regionalliga players
Chemnitzer FC players
FC Carl Zeiss Jena players
Footballers from Saxony
VfB Auerbach players